Michael Lord-Castle (born 5 September 1959 in Birmingham) is an English citizen, who has appeared in numerous news stories worldwide, courting controversy with his actions.

Professional History
In 1985 he founded the Insolvency Advisory Service.

In 2001 Lord-Castle attempted to launch a business class only airline, Blue Fox Executive Airlines, with Rt Hon Lord Tebbit as Chairman. The airline formally launched after the 11 September attacks in a period of uncertainty for airlines, and failed to fly.

In 2004 Michael Lord-Castle was labelled an 'Anglo-Saxon thug' by French President Jacques Chirac after upsetting the French trade unions engaged in action on behalf of a British business with a factory in Dourdan.

In 2005, he was involved as an 'insolvency expert' with direct action taken by a haulage supplier to retailer Tesco, which involved blockading a number of Tesco sites with lorries in order to demand payment.

In 2006, Lord-Castle was present in the Maldives as part of the "Global Protection Committee", which Lord-Castle claimed was a group working since 1943 on behalf of a number of governmental agencies, during the run up to rallies intended at bringing about democratic change. The group was accused of being mercenary, and of plotting a coup. Lord-Castle and four of his associates were deported from the Maldives and banned for life.

Also in 2006, Lord-Castle appeared in court after he was stopped by police who found that he had fitted his car with blue lights and a siren. This case law precedent led to all vehicles not capable of fitting a stretcher (including response cars and motorbikes of NHS ambulance trusts) being unable to lawfully fit blue lights or sirens, and was used in this way in subsequent cases.

References

External links 
 Michael Lord-Castle's official website

English businesspeople
Living people
1959 births